1 More Hit is a documentary film by Shauna Garr. It follows the life of hip hop producer J-Swift, formerly of The Pharcyde, from homelessness and crack addiction to his mission to win back his life and music career. 1 More Hit premiered at the 2007 South by Southwest Film Festival. The documentary highlighted J-Swift's charismatic personality and fighting his addiction to rebuild his recording career.

In 2008, the festival version was nominated for a PRISM Award by the Entertainment Industries Council (EIC), in recognition of an outstanding contribution that demonstrates the entertainment industry's sincere efforts to accurately depict drug, alcohol and tobacco use and addiction. The filmmaker updated the documentary in 2011 when it was picked up for digital release by Gravitas Ventures. It released digitally over 16.5 million homes. The doc had its ON DEMAND premiere in January 2012 and is available on DVD through Smart Girl Productions.

Shauna Garr started a Kickstarter Project for raising funds for the post production works of the document and she managed to achieve the target of $17,000 when 29 backers decided to support her project, collecting $17,011 in total.

As of 2021, the film is not widely available for streaming or purchase.

Cast
All appearing as themselves.
J-Swift
Akon
Twink Caplan
Shauna Garr
Paul Mooney

References

External links
 
 
 Article in Hiphopnews

American documentary films
2007 films
2007 documentary films
Documentary films about hip hop music and musicians
Documentary films about homelessness in the United States
2000s hip hop films
2000s American films